Amatori Wasken Lodi is a roller hockey team from Lodi, Italy. It was established in 1965.

Honours

National
Serie A1 italian championship: 4
 1980–81, 2016–17, 2017–18, 2020–21
Coppa Italia: 4
 1978, 2011–12, 2015–16, 2020–21
Italian Supercup: 2
 2016, 2018
League Cup: 1
 2009–10

International

WS Europe Cup: 1
1986–87
Cup Winners' Cup: 1
1993–94

See also 
 Hockey Club Lodi

References

External links
Official Website.

Roller hockey clubs in Italy
Sports clubs established in 1965
1965 establishments in Italy